Paramaenas strigosus is a moth of the family Erebidae. It was described by Karl Grünberg in 1911. It is found in Kenya, Lesotho, Namibia, South Africa and Zimbabwe.

References

Spilosomina
Moths described in 1911